Selector may refer to:

Selector, electrical or mechanical component, a switch
Selector, music scheduling software for radio stations created by Radio Computing Services
Selector, of music, otherwise known as a disc jockey 
Selector, a person who made a selection of crown land in some Australian colonies
Selector (sport), person that chooses players for a sports team
Selector, part of Cascading Style Sheets programming language
"Selector", a song by Skindred from the 2002 album Babylon
Selector, part of Objective-C programming language
The Selector, radio program
Choice function on a family of sets

See also
The Selecter, a UK ska band
Moshe Selecter, Israeli footballer